The 1906 Michigan State Normal Normalites football team represented Michigan State Normal College (later renamed Eastern Michigan University) during the 1906 college football season.  In their first season under head coach Henry Schulte, the Normalites compiled a record of 5–0–1, shut out four of six opponents, and outscored all opponents by a combined total of 52 to 11. Leroy N. Brown was the team captain.

Henry Shulte began his association with Michigan Normal in 1905 as the school's track coach. He had been a football player at the University of Michigan on Fielding H. Yost's "Point-a-Minute" teams from 1903 to 1905.

In early October 1906, Michigan Normal reported record enrollment with 1,000 students having enrolled on the first day (quintupling the prior first-day enrollment of 200); total enrollment was expected to reach 1,500.

Schedule

References

Michigan State Normal
Eastern Michigan Eagles football seasons
Michigan State Normal Normalites football